Patter is a kind of speech.

Patter may also refer to:
 Patter song
 Glasgow Patter (a.k.a. The Patter)